The Electronic Healthcare Network Accreditation Commission (EHNAC) is a voluntary, self-governing standards development organization (SDO) in the United States established to develop standard criteria and accredit organizations that electronically exchange healthcare data. These entities include electronic health networks, payers, financial services firms, health information exchanges (HIEs), management service organizations and e-prescribing solution providers.

Overview 
EHNAC cites its mission is to promote standards-based accreditation within the healthcare data exchange industry.
EHNAC was founded in 1993 and is a federally-recognized and tax-exempt, 501(c)(6) non-profit accrediting body with the end purpose of improving transactional quality, operational efficiency and data security in healthcare.

As an independent, self-governing SDO, EHNAC represents a diverse mix of healthcare stakeholders across the industry spectrum. Electronic health networks, payers, hospitals, physicians, consumer groups, financial services firms, security organizations and vendors are all working together to establish criteria for self-regulation.

By working with other industry stakeholders, EHNAC looks to provide accreditation services that promote standards, administrative simplification and open competition in the marketplace. Once full accreditation is achieved by an organization, the accreditation is granted for a period of two years, after which they may re-apply for continued accreditation.

EHNAC accredits organizations under the following accreditation programs:
 ePAP – e-Prescribing Accreditation Program
 DTAAP - Direct Trusted Agent Accreditation Program
 FSAP EHN – Financial Services Accreditation Program for Electronic Health Networks
 FSAP Lockbox – Financial Services Accreditation Program for Lockbox Services
 HIEAP – Healthcare Information Exchange Accreditation Program 
 HNAP-70 – Healthcare Network Accreditation Plus Select SAS 70© Criteria Program
 HNAP EHN – Healthcare Network Accreditation Program for Electronic Health Networks
 HNAP Medical Biller – Healthcare Network Accreditation Program for Medical Billers
 HNAP TPA – Healthcare Network Accreditation Program for TPAs 
 MSOAP – Management Service Organization Accreditation Program
 OSAP – Outsourced Services Accreditation Program

Current criteria for all programs are available for public review on the organization’s website.

History 

EHNAC grew out of the 1993 Workgroup for Electronic Data Interchange (WEDI) meeting, sponsored by the Network Architecture and Accreditation Technical Advisory Group. The healthcare transactions industry agreed there was a need for a self-governing body to develop standards for the industry, and the Association for Electronic Health Care Transactions (AFEHCT) championed the cause by sponsoring an Accreditation Workgroup.

More than thirty representatives from all facets of the healthcare transactions industry participated in a series of meetings and surveys to develop the first industry standards for data transmission, data security, advertising and resource capability. Funded by a loan from AFEHCT, the independent, self-governing EHNAC was born and began accrediting electronic health networks in 1995.

Recently, EHNAC, WEDI, Healthcare Information and Management Systems Society (HIMSS) Medical Banking Project, and NACHA – The Electronic Payments Association collaborated to create the Compliance Guidelines for Financial Institutions in the Healthcare Sector: HITECH and the HIPAA Privacy and Security Rules white paper which was released August 2, 2010.

This was the result of an industry forum convened by EHNAC and WEDI February 10, 2009 to address the current state of medical banking as it relates to HIPAA, American Recovery & Reinvestment Act of 2009, HITECH Act and their impact on the financial services industry. The “Demystifying the Banking Exemption under HIPAA” forum discussed the requirements under legislation for financial institutions, management of various state protection regulations and the implementation practices of third-party accreditation and certification programs.

EHNAC and WEDI collaborated to address the current state of health data protection needs within the financial services industry and in context with the current regulatory federal legislation in a preceding white paper. The Financial Services Current State in Healthcare white paper was released November 16, 2009.

Commissioners 

EHNAC is composed of Executive Director Lee Barrett, Vice President of Operations Debra Hopkinson, and no less than nine stakeholders and consumer representatives from private and public sector organizations. EHNAC's commissioners each serve three-year terms.

DirectTrust Partnership 

In November 2012, EHNAC announced its partnership with DirectTrust.org to create the Direct Trusted Agent Accreditation Program (DTAAP), a national accreditation program for health information “trusted agent” service providers, including health information service providers (HISPs), certificate authorities (CAs) and registration authorities (RAs). Impetus for the initiative came from the growth of electronic health records, health information exchanges, and programs such as Meaningful Use, which drive interoperability and data sharing among healthcare stakeholders.

In April 2013, DirectTrust.org, Inc. was awarded a cooperative agreement from the Office of the National Coordinator for Health Information Technology (ONC) as part of the Exemplar HIE Governance Entities Program for continued development and implementation of DTAAP.

Kantara Initiative Collaboration 

In August 2013, EHNAC and Kantara Initiative announced the formation of a collaborative relationship to further industry adoption of trusted information sharing and identity systems. In particular, the areas of mutual recognition may include Registration Authority at the user level, organizational trust through best practices, and operations of Identity Federations (Federation Operator guidelines).

References

External links 
 Official website

Organizations established in 1993
501(c)(6) nonprofit organizations
Standards organizations in the United States
Medical and health organizations based in Connecticut
Health informatics organizations